Bridge in Tinicum Township is a historic Pratt pony truss bridge located at Point Pleasant in Tinicum Township, Bucks County, Pennsylvania. It spans the Pennsylvania Canal.  It has a single span with a length of 82 feet long, and was constructed in 1877.

It was listed on the National Register of Historic Places in 1988.

Gallery

References 
 

Road bridges on the National Register of Historic Places in Pennsylvania
Bridges completed in 1877
Bridges in Bucks County, Pennsylvania
National Register of Historic Places in Bucks County, Pennsylvania
Metal bridges in the United States
Pratt truss bridges in the United States
1877 establishments in Pennsylvania